Minnechaduza Creek is a stream in the U.S. states of Nebraska and South Dakota.

Minnechaduza is a name derived from the Sioux language meaning "rapid water".

See also
List of rivers of South Dakota

References

Rivers of Cherry County, Nebraska
Rivers of Todd County, South Dakota
Rivers of Nebraska
Rivers of South Dakota